Taghzout is a town and commune in Guemar District, El Oued Province, Algeria. According to the 2008 census it has a population of 13,934, up from 11,147 in 1998, with an annual growth rate of 2.3%.

Climate

Taghzout has a hot desert climate (Köppen climate classification BWh), with very hot summers and mild winters. Rainfall is light and sporadic, and summers are particularly dry.

Transportation

Taghzout is on the N48 highway connecting El Oued to the south and Still to the north. From Still, the N3 leads to Biskra.

Taghzout is served by Guemar Airport.

Education

4.6% of the population has a tertiary education, and another 11.7% has completed secondary education. The overall literacy rate is 80.1%, and is 87.7% among males and 72.1% among females.

Localities
The commune of Taghzout is composed of seven localities:

Taghzout
Bagouza

References

Neighbouring towns and cities

Communes of El Oued Province
Cities in Algeria
Algeria